Parotocinclus seridoensis is a species of catfish in the family Loricariidae. It is native to South America, where it occurs in the upper basin of the Piranhas River in Brazil. The specific epithet of this species, seridoensis, refers to the Caatinga ecoregion of Brazil where the species is found, which is reportedly locally known as "Sertão do Seridó". The species reaches 4.3 cm (1.7 inches) SL.

References 

Loricariidae
Catfish of South America
Fish described in 2013
Otothyrinae